Acrotretidae is a family of brachiopods, the type family of the Acrotretida order.

References

Lingulata